Selected discography of recordings conducted by Thomas Beecham:

J.S. Bach 
Phoebus and Pan
Balakirev
Symphony No. 1 – Royal Philharmonic Orchestra (RPO)
Balfe
The Bohemian Girl
Beethoven
Piano Concerto No. 4 – Arthur Rubinstein/London Philharmonic Orchestra (LPO)
The Ruins of Athens– Beecham Choral Society/ RPO
Symphony No. 2 – RPO
Symphony No. 7 – RPO
Symphony No. 8– RPO

Fidelio
Benjamin
The Devil Take Her
Berlioz
La damnation de Faust – RPO
Harold in Italy – Riddle/RPO
King Lear Overture – RPO
Le Corsaire Overture – RPO
Les Francs Juges Overture – RPO
Les Troyens Overture – RPO
Roman Carnival Overture – RPO
Symphonie fantastique – RPO
Trojan March – RPO (one of his last recordings, made in stereo in December 1959)
Waverley Overture – RPO
Bizet
Carmen – Victoria de Los Angeles, Nicolai Gedda/French National Radio Orchestra
Carnaval à Rome – RPO
La jolie fille de Perth suite – RPO
L'Arlésienne Suites 1 & 2 – RPO
Patrie Overture – RPO
Symphony in C – French National Radio Orchestra
Boccherini
Overture in D – RPO
Borodin
Polovetsian Dances – Beecham Choral Society/RPO
Brahms
Academic Festival Overture – RPO
Symphony No. 2 – RPO
Tragic Overture – LPO
Chabrier 
España, rapsodie pour orchestre – RPO
Gwendoline Overture – French National Radio Orchestra
Joyeuse marche – RPO
Cherubini
Les deux journées – RPO
Debussy
Cortège & Air de danse – RPO
Prélude à l'après-midi d'un faune – RPO
L'Enfant prodigue
Pelléas et Mélisande
Delibes
Le roi s'amuse – RPO
Delius
Appalachia – BBC Chorus/LPO
Brigg Fair – RPO
Dance Rhapsody No. 2 – RPO
Fennimore and Gerda Intermezzo – RPO
Florida Suite: Daybreak & Dance – RPO
Irmelin Prelude – RPO
A Mass of Life
On Hearing the First Cuckoo in Spring – RPO
Sleighride – RPO
A Song Before Sunrise – RPO
Summer Evening – RPO
Summer Night on the River – RPO
Dvořák
Legend in G minor – RPO
Slavonic Rhapsody No. 3 – LPO
Symphony No. 8 – RPO
Fauré
Dolly Suite – French National Radio Orchestra
Pavane – French National Radio Orchestra
Franck
Symphony in D minor – French National Radio Orchestra
Goldmark
Rustic Wedding Symphony – RPO
Gounod
Faust Ballet music – RPO
Le sommeil de Juliette – RPO
Grétry
Zémire et Azore ballet music – RPO
Grieg
Peer Gynt Suites – RPO
Symphonic dance in A – RPO
Handel
Amaryllis – RPO
Love in Bath – RPO
Messiah (complete) – Jon Vickers et al./ RPO
Solomon (complete) – John Cameron/ RPO
The Faithful Shepherd – RPO
The Gods Go A'Begging – RPO
The Great Elopement – LPO
Haydn
Symphonies 93 – 104 – RPO
The Seasons – Morison, Young, Langdon /RPO
Lalo
Symphony – RPO
Massenet
Last sleep of the Virgin – RPO
Waltz from Cendrillon – RPO
Mendelssohn
Fair Melusine Overture – RPO
Symphony No. 4, Italian – RPO**(Mendelssohn) I Violin concerto (Szigeti)/LPO
Mozart
Clarinet Concerto – Jack Brymer/RPO
The Magic Flute Overture – RPO
The Magic Flute (complete) – Lemnitz, Roswaenge, Berlin Philharmonic
Flute & Harp Concerto – Le Roy, Laskine/RPO
[[Concerto for Violin in D, K 218 --Szigeti/LPO**German Dance K605 – RPO
Haffner March K249 – RPO
The Marriage of Figaro Overture – LPO
Minuet from Divertimento in D K131 – RPO
Requiem – Morison et al./RPO
Symphony No. 31 – Suisse Romande Orchestra
Symphony No. 34 – Suisse Romande Orchestra
Symphony No. 35 – LPO
Symphony No. 36 – LPO
Symphony No. 38 – LPO
Symphony No. 39 – Suisse Romande Orchestra
Symphony No. 40 – LPO
Symphony No. 41 – RPO
Thamos: Entr'acte – RPO
Mussorgsky
Khovanshchina Dance of the Persian Slaves – RPO
Offenbach
Les contes d'Hoffmann suite – RPO
Serge Prokofiev,**Violin concerto no 1 op. 19--Szigeti/LPO*Puccini
La Bohème – Jussi Bjorling, Victoria de Los Angeles/ RCA Victor Symphony Orchestra
Rimsky-Korsakov
Scheherazade – RPO
Rossini
La Cambiale di matrimonio Overture – RPO
La Gazza Ladra Overture – RPO
Semiramide Overture – RPO
Saint-Saëns
Le Rouet d'Omphale – RPO
Samson & Dalila Dance of the Priestesses/ Bacchanale – RPO
Schubert
Symphony No. 1 – RPO
Symphony No. 2 – RPO
Symphony No. 3 – RPO
Symphony No. 5 – RPO
Symphony No. 6 – RPO
Symphony No. 8 – RPO
Sibelius
Symphony No. 2 – BBC Symphony Orchestra
Symphony No. 4 – LPO
Symphony No. 6 – RPO
Symphony No. 7 – RPO
Tapiola – LPO
Valse Triste – RPO
Karelia Suite – RPO
Smetana
The Bartered Bride Overture and Polka– RPO
Strauss
Don Quixote – Wallenstein/New York Philharmonic Orchestra
Ein Heldenleben – RPO (this recording, on a Capitol LP Release, contains a difficult to explain disconnect between the two sides of the orchestra, as 1 side plays a measure behind the other. This oddity takes place just after the second brass fanfare just at the end of side 1. This strange moment does not happen on the CD or EMI LP release. Can someone out there explain this? It is clearly not just a missed mistake by the orchestra, but a major mastering error. Please post your answer here, but you will have to be a musician who can follow the dense scoring in Strauss's Ein Heldenleben.)
Suppé 
Morning Noon and Night – RPO
Poet & Peasant Overture – RPO
Tchaikovsky
Eugene Onegin , waltz – RPO
Francesca da Rimini – LPO
Symphony No. 5 – LPO
Vidal
Zino Zina Gavotte – RPO
Wagner
Die Meistersinger von Nürnberg Prelude and Suite – RPO
The Flying Dutchman Overture – RPO
Götterdämmerung Funeral March and Rhine Journey – RPO
Lohengrin Prelude – RPO
Parsifal Karfreitagszauber – RPO
Weber
Der Freischütz Overture – LPO
Oberon Overture – LPO

References
Procter-Gregg, Humphry (ed) (1976). Beecham Remembered, pp. 201–03.  London: Duckworth. 

Classical music in England
Discographies of classical conductors